Alice Desjardins is a former judge of the Canadian Federal Court of Appeal, having served from June 29, 1987, to August 11, 2009.  In 2013, Desjardins was listed as a NAFTA adjudicator.

References

Living people
Judges of the Federal Court of Appeal (Canada)
Canadian women judges
Year of birth missing (living people)